Melo (also known as Malo) is an Afro-Asiatic language spoken in the Gamo Gofa Zone of the Southern Nations, Nationalities, and People's Region in Ethiopia.

Notes 

North Omotic languages
Languages of Ethiopia